The Atumashi Monastery (formally Mahā Atulaveyan Kyaungdawgyi or  ) is a Buddhist monastery located in Mandalay, Myanmar (Burma).

History 

It was built in 1857 by King Mindon, two years after the capital was moved to Mandalay. The monastery was built at a cost of 500,000 rupees. The original monastery structure was built using teak, covered with stucco on the outside, with its peculiar feature being that it was surmounted by five graduated rectangular terraces instead of the traditional pyatthats, Burmese-style tiered and spired roofs. 

During the fire, a 19.2-carat (32 ratti) diamond, which adorned the Buddha image (originally given to King Bodawphaya by Maha Nawrahta, the Governor of Arakan) disappeared as well.

In 1996, Burma's Archaeological Department reconstructed the monastery with prison labor.

Images

Notes

References

Monasteries in Myanmar
19th-century Buddhist temples
Buildings and structures in Mandalay Region
Religious buildings and structures completed in 1857
1857 establishments in Burma
Buddhist temples in Mandalay